Elizabeth Jane Fairs (born 1977), is a female former athlete who competed for England.

Athletics career
She became the British champion in 2003 after winning the British 400 metres hurdles title.

She represented England in the 100 metres hurdles event, at the 1998 Commonwealth Games in Kuala Lumpur, Malaysia.

References

1977 births
Living people
English female hurdlers
Athletes (track and field) at the 1998 Commonwealth Games
Commonwealth Games competitors for England